Adenia heterophylla, commonly known in Australia as the lacewing vine, is a climbing plant in the family Passifloraceae. It has a broad distribution spanning the equator, from the south eastern corner of China, through Indochina and Malesia, to northern Australia. In Australia it serves as a food plant for larvae of the glasswing, red lacewing and cruiser butterflies.

Taxonomy
First described as Modecca heterophylla by the German-Dutch botanist Carl Ludwig Blume in 1826, this species was reviewed by Dutch botanist Sijfert Hendrik Koorders who gave it the current binomial name, and published it in the work Exkursionsflora von Java, umfassend die Blütenpflanzen mit besonderer Berücksichtigung der im Hochgebirge wildwachsenden Arten im Auftrage des Niederländischen Kolonialministeriums in 1912.

Infraspecies
, there are five infraspecies accepted by Plants of the World Online, as follows:

Distribution and habitat
The lacewing vine grows in a variety of tropical forest types including rainforest, beach forest, monsoon forest and vine thickets. It is native to the following areas: Andaman Islands, Bismarck Archipelago, Borneo, Cambodia, south east China, Hainan, Java, Laos, Lesser Sunda Islands, Maluku Islands, New Guinea, Nicobar Islands, the Northern Territory, Philippines, Queensland, Sulawesi, Sumatera, Taiwan, Thailand, Vietnam and Western Australia.

Conservation
This species is listed by the Queensland Department of Environment and Science as least concern. , it has not been assessed by the IUCN.

Gallery

References

External links
 
 
 View a map of historical sightings of this species at the Australasian Virtual Herbarium
 View observations of this species on iNaturalist
 View images of this species on Flickriver

heterophylla
Flora of Guangdong
Flora of Guangxi
Flora of Hainan
Flora of Taiwan
Flora of Indo-China
Flora of Malesia
Flora of Western Australia
Flora of the Northern Territory
Flora of Queensland
Taxa named by Sijfert Hendrik Koorders
Taxa described in 1826